Al-Jafi'ah is a Syrian village located in the Hirbnafsah Subdistrict in Hama District. According to the Syria Central Bureau of Statistics (CBS), al-Jafi'ah had a population of 833 in the 2004 census. Its inhabitants are predominantly Sunni Muslims.

References

Bibliography

 

Populated places in Hama District